The 1939 Ole Miss Rebels football team represented the University of Mississippi in the 1939 college football season. The Rebels were led by second-year head coach Harry Mehre and played their home games at Hemingway Stadium in Oxford, Mississippi. After winning their first three games of the season, Ole Miss made their first ever appearance in the AP Poll. Their victory over rival Vanderbilt was also their first ever; they had lost the first 19 match-ups in the series over a 45-year span. They would finish with a record of 7–2 (2–2 SEC), to finish fifth in the Southeastern Conference.

Schedule

References

Ole Miss
Ole Miss Rebels football seasons
Ole Miss Rebels football